Lipid microdomains are formed when lipids undergo lateral phase separations yielding stable coexisting lamellar domains. These phase separations can be induced by changes in temperature, pressure, ionic strength or by the addition of divalent cations or proteins. The question of whether such lipid microdomains observed in model lipid systems also exist in biomembranes had motivated considerable research efforts. Lipid domains are not readily isolated and examined as unique species, in contrast to the examples of lateral heterogeneity.
One can disrupt the membrane and demonstrate a heterogeneous range of composition in the population of the resulting vesicles or fragments. Electron microscopy can also be used to demonstrate lateral inhomogeneities in biomembranes.

Often, lateral heterogeneity has been inferred from biophysical techniques where the observed signal indicates multiple populations rather than the expected homogeneous population. An example of this is the measurement of the diffusion coefficient of a fluorescent lipid analogue in soybean protoplasts. Membrane microheterogeneity is sometimes inferred from the behavior of enzymes, where the enzymatic activity does not appear to be correlated with the average lipid physical state exhibited by the bulk of the membrane. Often, the methods suggest regions with different lipid fluidity, as would be expected of coexisting gel and liquid crystalline phases within the biomembrane. This is also the conclusion of a series of studies where differential effects of perturbation caused by cis and trans fatty acids are interpreted in terms of preferential partitioning of the two liquid crystalline and gel-like domains.

See also

 Biochemistry
 Essential fatty acid
 Lipid raft
 PIP2 domain
 Lipid signaling
 Saturated and unsaturated compounds

References

Biomembranes, Molecular structure and function, by Robert B. Gennis, p. 164, Springer-Verlag, New York, 1989.
Shape instabilities in charged lipid domains. Journal of Physical Chemistry B, vol.106, pp. 12351-12353, 2002.
Differential Impact of Intracellular Carboxyl Terminal Domains on Lipid Raft Localization of the Murine Gonadotropin-Releasing Hormone Receptor. Biology of Reproduction 74(5):788-797. 2006.
Investigation of the lipid domains and apolipoprotein orientation in reconstituted high density lipoproteins by fluorescence and IR methods. J. Biol. Chem., Vol. 265, Issue 32, 20044–20050, Nov, 1990.

External links 

  - Lipid microdomain formation.
  - Lipid microdomain clustering.
  - Lipid microdomain signaling.
 SCIMP protein

Biochemistry